Kosamba Junction railway station is a railway station on the Western Railway network in the state of Gujarat, India. Kosamba Junction railway station is 31 km far away from Surat railway station. Passenger, MEMU and few Express/Superfast trains halt at Kosamba Junction railway station.

Nearby stations 
Kim is the nearest railway station towards Mumbai, whereas Hathuran is the nearest railway station towards Vadodara.

Major trains 
Passenger Trains:

 59049/50 Valsad - Viramgam Passenger
 69149/50 Virar - Bharuch MEMU
 59439/40 Mumbai Central - Ahmedabad Passenger
 59441/42 Ahmedabad - Mumbai Central Passenger
 69111/12 Surat - Vadodara MEMU
 69171/72 Surat - Bharuch MEMU
 69109/10 Vadodara - Surat MEMU

Following Express/Superfast trains halt at Kosamba Junction railway station in both directions:

 19033/34 Valsad - Ahmedabad Gujarat Queen Express
 12929/30 Valsad - Dahod Intercity Superfast Express
 19023/24 Mumbai Central - Firozpur Janata Express
 19215/16 Mumbai Central - Porbandar Saurashtra Express
 22929/30 Bhilad - Vadodara Superfast Express
 22959/60 Surat - Jamnagar Intercity Superfast Express
 22961/62 Surat - Hapa Intercity Weekly Superfast Express
 22953/54 Mumbai Central - Ahmedabad Gujarat Superfast Express
 19217/28 Bandra Terminus - Jamnagar Saurashtra Janata Express
 22927/28 Bandra Terminus - Ahmedabad Lok Shakti Superfast Express
 19019/20 Bandra Terminus - Dehradun Express
 19115/16 Dadar - Bhuj Sayajinagari Express

References

See also
 Surat district

Railway stations in Surat district
Vadodara railway division
Railway junction stations in Gujarat
Transport in Surat